Hawkins Hill is a mountain in the Central New York Region of New York. It is located in the Town of Hartwick, Otsego County, New York, east-northeast of Hartwick. As of 2012, the hill supported a communications tower that is part of Broome County, New York Public Safety Communications System.

References

Mountains of Otsego County, New York
Mountains of New York (state)